Dejan Medaković (7 July 1922 – 1 July 2008) was a Serbian art historian, writer and academician. Medaković had served as President of the Serbian Academy of Sciences and Arts from 1998 to 2003, as Dean of the University of Belgrade Faculty of Philosophy (1971–1973), and was a member of the Matica srpska as well as other scholarly associations.

Life
Dejan Medaković was born on 7 July 1922 in Zagreb (then the Kingdom of the Serbs, Croats and Slovenes (now Croatia) in an ethnic Serb family. His father, Đorđe Medaković, was an economist; his mother, Anastazija, a housewife. His paternal grandfather, Bogdan Medaković, had been a political leader of Serbs in Croatia during the Austro-Hungarian reign, president of the Serb Independent Party and president of the Croat-Serb Coalition, and Speaker of the Croatian Sabor from 1908 to 1918. Dejan Medaković's great-grandfather Danilo had lived in the Kingdom of Serbia and held various positions in the administrations of princes Miloš and Mihailo Obrenović. On his mother's side he was a descendant of Austrian military nobility.

Medaković finished his lower gymnasium education on the island of Badija near Korčula on the southern Adriatic coast, before moving to Sremski Karlovci, where he finished his higher gymnasium studies. During the Second World War he lived in Belgrade as a refugee. From 1942 to 1946 he worked as a volunteer-assistant in Prince Pavle's Museum in Belgrade (today the National Museum of Serbia). He graduated in 1949 and later got his doctorate in 1954 at the Belgrade Faculty of Philosophy, in the Art History Department.

He became a member of the faculty at the University of Belgrade in 1954, where he would remain until his retirement in 1982. Between 1971 and 1973 he was also the dean of the Faculty of Philosophy. He was elected as a corresponding member of the Serbian Academy of Sciences and Arts (SANU) in 1972 and was promoted to a full member in 1981. He was also a member of the European Academy of Sciences and Arts in based in Salzburg, the Austrian Society for Eighteenth-Century Studies (ÖGE 18), the Leibniz Society in Berlin, member of the Matica srpska Council in Novi Sad, and the president of the Vuk Karadžić Foundation Assembly.

He held various positions at SANU: he was the Secretary of the Department for Historical Sciences (1981–85), the Secretary General of the Academy (1985–94), and in 1999 Medaković was elected President of SANU, a post which he held until 2003. At Matica srpska he was in charge of the Department of Art History. He edited the Fine Arts Digest of Matica srpska journal. His research interests included a wide scope of topics in art history and art criticism, from Serbian medieval art to modern painting, but his main fields of expertise were Serbian Baroque painting and general cultural circumstances of the 18th century, as well as Serbian art of the 19th century.

Medaković was also a writer and a poet. He published many studies, essays, monographs, reviews and articles on various topics ranging from new developments in arts to current social and political issues. His studies have been collected and published in several books: Serbian Painters of the 18th Century (1968), The Paths of Serbian Baroque, Testimonials (1984), Explorers of Serbian Antiquity (1985), and Baroque and Serbs (1988). He was also a major contributor to the six-volume History of the Serb People (1981–1993), and other important publications such as Serbian Art of the 18th Century (1980), and Serbian Art of the 19th Century (1981).

In addition, he authored several important art monographs and studies dealing with cultural heritage of the Serbian Orthodox Church, writing about the monasteries of Hilandar and Savina. Other important works by Medaković include The Chronicles of Serbs in Trieste (1987), Serbs in Vienna, Serbs in Zagreb, Images of Belgrade in Old Etchings, Selected Serbian themes, and Letters. Medaković also penned five books of poetry, and an autobiographical prose cycle titled Ephemeris.

Medaković was the recipient of many distinguished awards and honours: the Herder Prize; the Anton Gindely Prize; the City of Belgrade October Award; the Prosveta Annual Award; the Order of Merit of the Federal Republic of Germany (Bundesverdienstkreuz); the Austrian Cross of Honour for Science and Arts; the Gold Medal of Merit of the Republic of Hungary, the Medal of Vuk Karadžić of the First Order, and many others.

He died from cancer on 1 July 2008, at the Oncological Institute of Belgrade Hospital.

Honors and awards 

 Prosveta Reward for literature, philosophy and history
 7 July Reward of Serbia
 1990 – Herder Prize, Republic of Austria
 Gindeli Rewards, Republic of Austria
 The Austrian Cross of Honour for Science and Arts
 October Reward of Belgrade
 Gold Medal of Merit of the Republic of Hungary
 Order of bischop of Zagreb Ist degree, Republic of Croatia
 Special Vuk's Rewards
 Annual Reward of Prosveta
 Order of Saint Sava, I degree
 Great Cross for Services to the Federal Republic of Germany
 Medal of Vuk Karadžić, I degree
 Crown of Despot Stefan Lazarević
 Golden ring of Despot Stefan Lazarević
 Bestseller reward, National library of Serbia

Works

Research works

Books of poetry

Books of short stories

Other works
Memoirs, autobiographical prose, letters, speeches:

References

External links

 Presidents of SASA  at the Serbian Academy of Sciences and Arts (SASA)

1922 births
2008 deaths
Writers from Zagreb
Serbs of Croatia
Serbian art historians
20th-century Serbian historians
Serbian autobiographers
Members of the Serbian Academy of Sciences and Arts
Academic staff of the University of Belgrade
Eastern Orthodox Christians from Serbia
Members of the European Academy of Sciences and Arts
Recipients of the Order of St. Sava
Herder Prize recipients
Recipients of the Order of Merit of the Federal Republic of Germany
Yugoslav historians